The 2014–15 season was Debreceni VSC's 37th competitive season, 22nd consecutive season in the OTP Bank Liga and 112th year in existence as a football club.

First team squad

Transfers

Summer

In:

Out:

Winter

In:

Out:

List of Hungarian football transfers summer 2014
List of Hungarian football transfers winter 2014–15

Competitions

Super Cup

Nemzeti Bajnokság I

League table

Results summary

Results by round

Matches

Hungarian Cup

League Cup

Group stage

Knockout phase

Champions League

The First and Second Qualifying Round draws took place at UEFA headquarters in Nyon, Switzerland on 23 June 2014.

Europa League

Statistics

Appearances and goals
Last updated on 9 December 2014.

|-
|colspan="14"|Youth players:

|-
|colspan="14"|Out to loan:

|-
|colspan="14"|Players no longer at the club:

|}

Top scorers
Includes all competitive matches. The list is sorted by shirt number when total goals are equal.

Last updated on 9 December 2014

Disciplinary record
Includes all competitive matches. Players with 1 card or more included only.

Last updated on 9 December 2014

Overall
{|class="wikitable"
|-
|Games played || 35 (17 OTP Bank Liga, 6 Champions League, 4 Hungarian Cup and 8 Hungarian League Cup)
|-
|Games won || 18 (9 OTP Bank Liga, 2 Champions League, 3 Hungarian Cup and 4 Hungarian League Cup)
|-
|Games drawn || 8 (4 OTP Bank Liga, 2 Champions League, 0 Hungarian Cup and 2 Hungarian League Cup)
|-
|Games lost || 8 (4 OTP Bank Liga, 2 Champions League, 1 Hungarian Cup and 1 Hungarian League Cup)
|-
|Goals scored || 63
|-
|Goals conceded || 25
|-
|Goal difference || +38
|-
|Yellow cards || 56
|-
|Red cards || 8
|-
|rowspan="1"|Worst discipline ||  László Zsidai (4 , 2 )
|-
|rowspan="2"|Best result || 6–0 (A) v Mórahalom - Magyar Kupa - 10-09-2014
|-
| 6–0 (A) v Békéscsaba - Ligakupa - 12-11-2014
|-
|rowspan="3"|Worst result || 1–3 (A) v BATE Borisov - UEFA Champions League - 05-08-2014
|-
| 1–3 (A) v Young Boys - UEFA Europa League - 21-08-2014
|-
| 0–2 (H) v Pécs - OTP Bank Liga - 13-09-2014
|-
|rowspan="1"|Most appearances ||  László Zsidai (27 appearances)
|-
|rowspan="1"|Top scorer ||  Tibor Tisza (8 goals)
|-
|Points || 65/105 (61.91%)
|-

References

External links
 Eufo
 Official Website 
 UEFA
 fixtures and results

Debreceni VSC seasons
Debrecen